Wu Yan may refer to:

Wu Yan (general) ( 3rd century), general during the Eastern Wu and Jin periods
Wu Yan (footballer) (born 1989), Chinese footballer